The Mahoning Drive-In Theater is a drive-in theater located in Lehighton, Pennsylvania, along Route 443. Opened in 1949, the Mahoning was one of many drive-in theaters that became popular in the United States following World War II. Attendance at the Mahoning waned by 2014, but the theater has since gained a resurgence in popularity due to the management's decision to screen primarily older cult films and B movies rather than newer releases. It is the last remaining drive-in theater in the US to screen films in 35 mm every weekend.

In July 2021, it was announced that the theater would be demolished and replaced by a solar farm. Following an outpouring of community support, the plans have been put on hold.

History
The Mahoning Drive-In Theater opened in 1949, amidst a wave of drive-in theaters that became popular in the US after World War II. According to Gene DeSantis, the theater's manager circa 1988, the first film screened at the Mahoning was 1948's April Showers.

Though drive-in attendance declined across the country with the advent of multiplex theaters in the 1970s and 1980s, the Mahoning remained in operation. However, by 2014, the Mahoning had seen a significant decline in attendance, sometimes with as few as 10 cars per show.

Projectionist Jeff Mattox (who started working at the Mahoning in 2001) decided, at the suggestion of then-volunteer employees Virgil Cardamone and Matt McClanahan, that the Mahoning would screen primarily older cult films and B movies, as opposed to newer releases. The decision proved successful, and attendance at the Mahoning soon rose in accordance with the addition of Exhumed Films themed programs like the recurring "Zombie Fest"—a marathon of films featuring zombies—and "Camp Blood"—a marathon of horror films set at summer camps. Films are commonly shown as double or triple features at the Mahoning, and are often accompanied by screenings of older movie trailers, other vintage advertisements, and themed sets and costumes by volunteer James T. Mills. The Mahoning has gone on to host events for Shudder, Joe Bob Briggs, and Troma Entertainment.

On July 13, 2021, it was announced that the land on which the theater is situated was optioned by a solar power company, Greenskies Clean Energy LLC, which plans to demolish the Mahoning (including its screen and marquee) and to construct a solar farm in its place. Following an outpouring of community support, the plans have been put on hold.

References

External links
 

Drive-in theaters in the United States
Cinemas and movie theaters in Pennsylvania
1949 establishments in Pennsylvania
Carbon County, Pennsylvania